Verkhny Budym is a rural locality (a settlement) in Kebratskoye Rural Settlement, Gaynsky District, Perm Krai, Russia. The population was 257 as of 2010. There are 7 streets.

Geography 
Verkhny Budym is located 40 km north of Gayny (the district's administrative centre) by road. Zhemchuzhny is the nearest rural locality.

References 

Rural localities in Gaynsky District